is a Japanese professional boxer. She is Japan's first ever five-division world champion, having held the WBA female flyweight title between March 2017 to April 2022. She also previously held the WBC female minimumweight; WBO female junior-flyweight; WBA female super-flyweight; and WBO female bantamweight titles between 2012 and 2017. As of September 2020, she is ranked as the world's best active female flyweight by The Ring and BoxRec.

Professional career
Fujioka made her professional debut on 15 September 2009, scoring a second-round technical knockout (TKO) victory against Napaporn Boonchuon (5–6, 3 KOs) at the Korakuen Hall in Tokyo, Japan. After winning her first three fights, all by TKO, she faced Kanittha Kokietgym (8–2, 2 KOs) for the vacant WBC-OPBF female minimumweight title on 24 September 2010, at the Korakuen Hall. Fujioka captured her first professional title via unanimous decision (UD), with two judges scoring the bout 98–92 and the third scoring it 98–93.

She successfully defended her WBC regional title in December before challenging for her first world title against reigning champion Anabel Ortiz. The bout took place on 8 May 2011 at the Korakuen Hall. Fujioka captured Ortiz' WBC female minimumweight title by eighth-round corner retirement (RTD) after Ortiz failed to come off her stool for the ninth round. At the time of the stoppage, Fujioka was ahead on all three judges' scorecards by 78–72.

Following four more wins, including two defences of her WBC world title against Kanittha Kokietgym in September 2011 and Victoria Argueta in October 2012, Fujioka moved up three weight divisions to challenge Naoko Yamaguchi for her WBA female super-flyweight title on 13 November 2013 at the Korakuen Hall. Fujioka scored a third-round knockdown en route to a UD victory to become a two division world champion, with two judges scoring the bout 97–92 and the third scoring it 98–91. After successfully defending her title against Tomoko Kawanishi in July 2014, Fujioka moved down in weight to challenge Susi Kentikian for her WBA female flyweight title on 8 November 2014 at the Porsche-Arena in Stuttgart, Germany. Fighting for the first time outside of Japan, Fujioka suffered the first defeat of her career in her attempt at a third world title via UD, with the judges' scorecards reading 96–94, 97–94 and 97–93.

She bounced back from defeat with a split decision (SD) win against Mariana Juárez in March 2015 before facing Hee Jung Yuh for the vacant WBO female bantamweight title. The bout took place on 19 October 2015 at the Korakuen Hall. Fujioka defeated Jung Yuh by UD, becoming a three-division world champion with two judges scoring the fight 100–90 and the third scoring it 99–91. Following a successful defence against Shindo Go in June 2016, she moved down two-divisions to challenge Jessica Chávez for her WBC female flyweight title on 1 October 2016 at Centro Regional de Deporte de Las Américas in Ecatepec de Morelos, Mexico. In a contest which saw Fujioka knocked down in the sixth round and a point deduction from Chavez in the tenth and final round for excessive holding, Fujioka suffered the second defeat of her career via UD, with the scorecards reading 94–93, 95–93 and 96–92.

In her next fight she faced Isabel Millan, making her second attempt for the WBA female flyweight title which was left vacant by Kentikian. The bout took place on 13 March 2017 at the Korakuen Hall. Fujioka dropped Millan twice, first in the second round and again in the tenth and final round, prompting the referee to call off the fight 21 seconds into the round, awarding Fujioka a TKO victory. At the time of the stoppage, all three judges had her ahead, with scores of 89–81 twice and 88–82. With the win, she became Japan's first ever four-division world champion. She moved down in weight for her next fight, facing Yokasta Valle for the vacant WBO junior-flyweight title on 1 December 2017 at the Korakuen Hall. Fujioka defeated Valle via UD with scores of 99–91, 98–92, and 96–94 to become Japan's first ever five-division world champion. Moving back up to flyweight, she successfully defended her WBA title by UD against Irma Sánchez in September 2018 before retaining the title through a split draw (SD) against WBO female junior-flyweight champion Tenkai Tsunami in July 2019.

Professional boxing record

See also
List of boxing quintuple champions
List of Japanese boxing world champions

References

External links

1975 births
Living people
Japanese women boxers
People from Ōsaki, Miyagi
Sportspeople from Miyagi Prefecture
World mini-flyweight boxing champions
World light-flyweight boxing champions
World flyweight boxing champions
World super-flyweight boxing champions
World bantamweight boxing champions
World Boxing Association champions
World Boxing Council champions
World Boxing Organization champions